Langast (Gallo: Langau) is a former commune in the Côtes-d'Armor department of Brittany in northwestern France. On 1 January 2019, it was merged into the new commune Plouguenast-Langast.

Population

Inhabitants of Langast are called langastiens or langastais in French.

See also
Communes of the Côtes-d'Armor department

References

External links

Former communes of Côtes-d'Armor